Endless Vacation may refer to:

 "Endless Vacation", a song by the John Entwistle Band from the 2000 album Music from Van-Pires
 Endless Vacation, a 2015 EP by Annie